The Weekend Nun is a 1972 American television film (an ABC Movie of the Week) directed by Jeannot Szwarc. It was based on the true story of Joyce Duco, a nun who became a probation officer.

Cast
Joanna Pettet
Vic Morrow
Ann Sothern
Kay Lenz

Reception
The Los Angeles Times wrote it was "surely one of the finest films ever made for television."

References

External links

The Weekend Nun at BFI
Review at Catholic Movies

1972 television films
1972 films
American television films
Films directed by Jeannot Szwarc
Films scored by Charles Fox
1970s English-language films